Juan Cordella (died 1552) was a Roman Catholic prelate who served as Bishop of Guardialfiera (1548–1552).

Biography
On 22 March 1548, Juan Cordella was appointed by Pope Paul III as Bishop of Guardialfiera. He served as Bishop of Guardialfiera until his death in 1552.

See also
Catholic Church in Italy

References

External links and additional sources
 (for Chronology of Bishops) 
 (for Chronology of Bishops) 

16th-century Italian Roman Catholic bishops
1552 deaths
Bishops appointed by Pope Paul III